In enzymology, a farnesyltranstransferase is an enzyme that catalyzes the chemical reaction

trans,trans-farnesyl diphosphate + isopentenyl diphosphate  diphosphate + geranylgeranyl diphosphate

Thus, the two substrates of this enzyme are trans,trans-farnesyl diphosphate and isopentenyl diphosphate, whereas its two products are diphosphate and geranylgeranyl diphosphate.

This enzyme belongs to the family of transferases, specifically those transferring aryl or alkyl groups other than methyl groups.  The systematic name of this enzyme class is trans,trans-farnesyl-diphosphate:isopentenyl-diphosphate farnesyltranstransferase. Other names in common use include geranylgeranyl-diphosphate synthase, geranylgeranyl pyrophosphate synthetase, geranylgeranyl-PP synthetase, farnesyltransferase, and geranylgeranyl pyrophosphate synthase.  This enzyme participates in biosynthesis of steroids and terpenoid biosynthesis.

This protein may use the morpheein model of allosteric regulation.

Structural studies

References

 

EC 2.5.1
Enzymes of known structure